Peter Pitseolak (1902–1973) was an Inuk photographer, sculptor, artist and historian. Pitseolak was Baffin Island's first indigenous photographer.

Life

Pitseolak was born September 2, 1902 on Nottingham Island, Northwest Territories. He lived most of his life in traditional Inuit camps near Cape Dorset, on the southwest coast of Baffin Island, now in the Canadian territory of Nunavut. In the face of rapid technological change in the Inuit community, Pitseolak dedicated himself to preserving knowledge of the traditional ways of living, by writing, sketching, and especially photography. He documented customs, hunting techniques, stories and myths. His brother was Pootoogoo, a chief.

In 1912 Pitseolak met photographer Robert J. Flaherty. Flaherty, best known today for his documentary movie Nanook of the North (1922), inspired Pitseolak's interest in photography. It was not until the 1930s, however, that Pitseolak took his first recorded photograph. This was for a white visitor who was afraid to approach a polar bear for a shot. Pitseolak took the photo for him, using the visitor's camera.

In 1923 Pitseolak was married to Annie from Lake Harbour, now Kimmirut. Seven children resulted from their marriage; only Udluriak and Kooyoo, two daughters, survived. Annie was sticken with tuberculosis in 1939 and died.

In the 1940s Pitseolak was living in Cape Dorset working for fur-traders when he acquired his first camera, from a Catholic missionary. With the help of his second wife Aggeok (1906-1977), he developed his first photographs in a hunting igloo. Many difficulties had to be overcome, including extreme climate changes, high light levels from the reflective snowscape, and the difficulty of obtaining film and developer. Peter and Aggeok experimented. They used a battery-powered flashlight covered with red cloth as a safelight, and a lens filter made from old sunglasses.

He was also a painter, executing a series of watercolors in 1939 for John Buchan, later 2nd Baron Tweedsmuir, son of Governor General John Buchan, 1st Baron Tweedsmuir.

Pitseolak wrote various diaries, notes and manuscripts, all in Inuktitut syllabics. Along with Dorothy Harley Eber, he published People From Our Side (1975), the story of his early life, and Peter Pitseolak's Escape From Death (1977), an account of a near disaster among the ice floes.

He photographed himself, his family, and community members in candid shots. He also posed them with traditional clothing and implements. Over twenty years, Pitseolak made more than 2,000 photographs of the disappearing traditional way of life. In 1961, at the age of 59, he left his camp at Keatuk and returned to settlement life at Cape Dorset. After his death in 1973, more than 1,500 negatives and photographs were purchased from his widow for the National museums of Canada (now part of Canadian Museum of History).

The famed sculptor Okpik Pitseolak (b. 1946) married Peter's son Mark Pitseolak. According to Terry Ryan, former manager of the West Baffin Eskimo Co-operative, Peter Pitseolak's nephew, Kananginak Pootoogook, greatly admired and was influenced by his uncle and also became an artist.

He died September 30, 1973 in Cape Dorset, Northwest Territories.

Gallery

See also 

Notable Aboriginal people of Canada

References

External links
Entry on the Artist Database of the Inuit Art Foundation

Inuit from the Northwest Territories
20th-century Canadian photographers
Inuit photographers
People from Kinngait
1902 births
1973 deaths
Writers from Nunavut
Artists from Nunavut
Canadian diarists
Inuit writers
Persons of National Historic Significance (Canada)
20th-century Canadian writers
20th-century Canadian painters
Inuit painters
20th-century diarists